The Estadio Olímpico Universitario de Colima is a multi-use stadium in Colima City, Colima, Mexico.  It is currently used mostly for football matches and is the home stadium for Colima F.C.  The stadium has a capacity of 11,812 people and opened in 1994.

References

External links

Colima City
Olimpico Universitario de Colima
Athletics (track and field) venues in Mexico